The Encyclopedia of Korean Culture is a Korean language encyclopedia published by the Academy of Korean Studies and DongBang Media Co. The articles in the encyclopedia are aimed at readers who want to learn about Korean culture and history, and were written by over 3,800 scholars and expert contributors — mainly associated with the Academy of Korean Studies. Munhwa Ilbo called it the most extensive encyclopedia of Korean studies.

In 2001, the digital edition EncyKorea was published on CD-ROM and DVD.

See also
Doosan Encyclopedia
List of digital library projects
Lists of encyclopedias
List of encyclopedias by branch of knowledge
List of encyclopedias by language
List of historical encyclopedias
List of online encyclopedias

References

External links

Website of DongBang Media Co., Ltd.

Korean studies
Korean encyclopedias
South Korean online encyclopedias
20th-century encyclopedias
21st-century encyclopedias
Area studies encyclopedias